Arena is a British television documentary series, made and broadcast by the BBC since 1 October 1975. Voted by TV executives in Broadcast magazine as one of the top 50 most influential programmes of all time, it has produced over six hundred episodes directed by, among others, Frederick Baker, Jana Boková, Jonathan Demme, Nigel Finch, Mary Harron, Vikram Jayanti, Vivian Kubrick, Paul Lee, Adam Low, Bernard MacMahon, James Marsh, Leslie Megahey, Volker Schlondorff, Martin Scorsese, Julien Temple, Anthony Wall, Leslie Woodhead, and Alan Yentob.

History

The arts strand Arena was initially created in 1975<ref>Tise Vahimagi. (2003-12) "Burton, Humphrey (1931-) ". BFI Screen Online". Retrieved 27 June 2013.</ref> by the BBC Head of Music & Arts at that time, Humphrey Burton, when he founded a magazine named Arena exploring art, design, filmmaking, and theatre. In 1977, under producer and director Leslie Megahey, the strand divided into Arena Theatre and Arena Art and Design, and Arena became less of a magazine and more a home for short, distinctive and stylish films about mainly British theatre and visual arts. In 1978 Megahey became editor of Omnibus and Alan Yentob, who had been supervising Arena Theatre, took over and the two themes were merged. The series, relaunched in January 1979 and renamed simply Arena, began to adopt a format of single subject essays. It earned great critical acclaim for its enthusiasm for the popular as well as the high arts. During Yentob's time as editor, Arena had six BAFTA nominations and three BAFTA awards.

A group of radical directors, notably Nigel Finch and Anthony Wall, gathered around Yentob and Arena, including Nigel Williams and Mary Dickinson. Hits from 1979 included Who Is Poly Styrene?, La Dame Aux Gladiolas, a portrait of Edna Everage, and most notably the groundbreaking My Way, an examination of the appeal of the song, by Finch and Wall. It was the first of their collaborations, which developed a new kind of arts film, taking an unlikely subject and building a poetic meditation on its various aspects - further examples include The Chelsea Hotel (1981), The Private Life of the Ford Cortina (1982), Desert Island Discs (1982). Other successes included Megahey's portrait of Orson Welles (1982), Williams's study of George Orwell (1982), Yentob's portrait of Mel Brooks (1981) and Wall's four-part documentary on Slim Gaillard (1989).

On Yentob's move to become Head of Music & Arts in 1985, Finch and Wall took over as joint editor of Arena until Finch's death in 1995. Following a period of uncertainty concerning the future of the arts strand, series editor Wall protected the series in a reshuffle of the BBC. Since then Arena has been transmitted outside the conventional weekly broadcast strand on BBC Two and BBC Four, and latterly on BBC Four.

Under Wall and Finch, Arena developed the idea of the themed evening, beginning with Blues Night (1985), followed by Caribbean Nights (1986), Animal Night (1989), Food Night (1990), Texas Saturday Night (1991), Radio Night simulcast with BBC Radio 4 (1993) and Stories My Country Told Me (1995), a three-and-a-half-hour presentation on Nations and Nationalism. Since then Arena has won numerous awards with regular screenings at the BFI Southbank and has continued to cover the arts and culture at the highest level, with films on Bob Dylan, Harold Pinter, The National Theatre and Spitting Image, to name but a few.Arena developed a substantial online presence featuring the Arena Hotel, a site that turns the 600-film Arena archive into a resource to build an online hotel for the stars. The Arena Hotel was nominated for a Focal International Award in 2013. Werner Herzog has praised the series as "the oasis in the sea of insanity that is television".

Wall retired in 2018, and the strand is now overseen by commissioning editor Mark Bell.

Branding
The programme's theme music is taken from the title track of the 1975 album Another Green World by Brian Eno, himself the subject of a 2010 Arena film subtitled Another Green World.

The Arena opening titles were voted among the "Top 5 Most Influential Opening Titles in the History of Television" by Broadcast magazine in 2004.

Series editors
Anthony Wall edited Arena since 1985. He joined the series in 1978 and became one of its leading directors.

Awards and nominationsArena has won a Primetime and International Emmys, a Grammy, nine BAFTAs, six Royal Television Society Awards, a Peabody and the Prix Italia. Arena also won the Sundance Grand Jury Prize for Paris Is Burning, the Best Performance Award for Lili Taylor's role in I Shot Andy Warhol at the Sundance Film Festival, and the SFFIF's Mel Novikoff Award.

 Selected filmography 

Sources
Vahimagi, Tise. British Television: An Illustrated Guide''. Oxford: Oxford University Press / British Film Institute, 1994. .

References

External links

Arena Hotel site at The Space

1975 British television series debuts
1970s British documentary television series
1980s British documentary television series
1990s British documentary television series
2000s British documentary television series
2010s British documentary television series
2020s British documentary television series
BBC high definition shows
BBC television documentaries
English-language television shows